The Wind at Four to Fly is a 2006 live release by the trance fusion band Disco Biscuits. It was released on SCI Fidelity on April 18, 2006.  It is the second to last album with the original line-up (Rocket 3 being the last) and contains songs from shows recorded between December 27–31, 2004.  The vocals, however, were re-recorded in the studio, in single takes to replicate a live performance.

The album's two discs are divided thematically: Disc One contains shorter songs while Disc Two was intended to showcase the band's longer jamming capabilities.  "Little Shimmy in a Conga Line" segues seamlessly into "Pat and Dex," resulting in 25 minutes of uninterrupted music.

Track listing

Disc One (77:02)
"World Is Spinning" (Gutwillig) – 3:52 Dec. 31, 2004 Hammerstein Ballroom, NY, NY
"Voices Insane" (Gutwillig) – 11:43 Dec. 27, 2004 Palace Theater, Albany, NY
"Caterpillar" (Brownstein) – 12:50 Dec. 31, 2004 Hammerstein Ballroom, NY, NY
"Kitchen Mitts" (Gutwillig) – 9:42 Dec. 29, 2004 Electric Factory, Philadelphia, PA
"Sweating Bullets" (Gutwillig) – 7:56 Dec. 30, 2004 Electric Factory, Philadelphia, PA
"Wet" (Brownstein) – 5:36 Dec. 28, 2004 Avalon Ballroom, Boston, MA
"Spy" (Magner) – 12:46 Dec. 29, 2004 Electric Factory, Philadelphia, PA
"Morph Dusseldorf" (Brownstein) – 12:37 Dec. 30, 2004 Electric Factory, Philadelphia, PA

Disc Two (72:31)
"Story of the World" (Gutwillig) – 17:25 Dec. 30, 2004 Electric Factory, Philadelphia, PA
"Basis for a Day" (Gutwillig, Abrahms) – 29:28 Dec. 29, 2004 Electric Factory, Philadelphia, PA
"Little Shimmy in a Conga Line > " (Gutwillig) – 17:08 Dec. 29, 2004 Electric Factory, Philadelphia, PA
"Pat and Dex" (Gutwillig, Brownstein) – 8:30 Dec. 29, 2004 Electric Factory, Philadelphia, PA

Personnel
Jon Gutwillig – Guitar, Vocals
Marc Brownstein – Bass, Vocals
Aron Magner – Keyboards, Vocals
Sam Altman – Drums

References

Disco Biscuits albums
2006 live albums